Union Avenue Bridge is a vehicular bridge over the Passaic River in northeastern New Jersey, crossing the county line at the town of Rutherford in Bergen County and the city of Passaic in Passaic County. It takes its name from Union Avenue (CR S32) in Rutherford which connects to River Drive (and access to Route 21) in Passaic. There is another Union Avenue Bridge traversing the Passaic at Little Falls

History
The bridge replaced an earlier structure built in 1896. In 1963 it was struck by a barge which left it damaged; requiring it remain in the open position for two weeks. It was dedicated to Douglas O. Mead (1894-1971), a World War I and World War II veteran.

See also
List of crossings of the Lower Passaic River
List of county routes in Bergen County, New Jersey
Rutherford (NJT station)

References

External links
Postcard 1909

Bridges over the Passaic River
Bridges completed in 2002
Road bridges in New Jersey
Rutherford, New Jersey
Buildings and structures in Passaic, New Jersey
Bridges in Bergen County, New Jersey
Bridges in Passaic County, New Jersey
Steel bridges in the United States
Concrete bridges in the United States